Giancarlo Ligabue (30 October 1931 – 25 January 2015) was an Italian paleontologist, scholar, politician and businessman.

He participated or directed over 130 expeditions around the world, and he made several paleontological discoveries, such as the Ligabueino, a noasaurid dinosaur named after him, and such as the unearthed deposits of hominid and dinosaurs fossils in the Ténéré desert. He collaborated with Piero Angela to several science documentaries. He was president of the Natural History Museum of Venice and founder of the Ligabue Study and Research Centre in Venice.

Ligabue was also businessman in the field of supplies and services for ships. He was the president of the  basketball team Reyer Venezia Mestre between the early sixties and early eighties. He was also a member of the European Parliament for Forza Italia within the Forza Europa group between 1994 and 1999.

References

1931 births
2015 deaths
Writers from Venice
Italian paleontologists
MEPs for Italy 1994–1999
Forza Italia MEPs
Businesspeople from Venice
Ca' Foscari University of Venice alumni
University of Paris alumni
Politicians from Venice